Asylum is the ninth major label album release of the Japanese rock band The Back Horn. The album was released on September 15, 2010.

Track listing

Raiden (雷電) - 'Raiden'
Rafflesia (ラフレシア)  - 'Rafflesia'
Tatakau Kimi yo (戦う君よ) - 'You will fight'
Eighteenth major single.
Saisei (再生) - 'Play'
Hagoromo (羽衣) - 'Plumage'
Kaigansen (海岸線) - 'Coastline'
Persona (ペルソナ) - 'Persona'
Taiyou no Shiwaza (太陽の仕業) - 'The work of the sun'
Tozasareta Sekai (閉ざされた世界) - 'Closed World'
Nineteenth major single.
Yogorenaki Namida (汚れなき涙) - 'Tainted Tears'
Parade (パレード) - 'Parade'

The Back Horn albums
2010 albums
Victor Entertainment albums